The Chester School District is a fully accredited elementary public school district responsible for the education of students in pre-kindergarten through eighth grades from Chester Borough and Chester Township, two municipalities in Morris County, New Jersey, United States.

As of the 2020–21 school year, the district, comprised of three schools, had an enrollment of 1,047 students and 106.1 classroom teachers (on an FTE basis), for a student–teacher ratio of 9.9:1.

The district is classified by the New Jersey Department of Education as being in District Factor Group "J", the highest of eight groupings. District Factor Groups organize districts statewide to allow comparison by common socioeconomic characteristics of the local districts. From lowest socioeconomic status to highest, the categories are A, B, CD, DE, FG, GH, I and J.

Students in public school for ninth through twelfth grades in both communities attend West Morris Mendham High School, which serves students from the surrounding Morris County school districts of Chester Borough, Chester Township, Mendham Borough and Mendham Township. The high school is part of the West Morris Regional High School District, which also serves students from Washington Township, who attend West Morris Central High School As of the 2020–21 school year, the high school had an enrollment of 1,142 students and 91.9 classroom teachers (on an FTE basis), for a student–teacher ratio of 12.4:1.

History
In June 2015, a feasibility study was released that discussed potential changes to the West Morris Regional High School District. In one scenario, West Morris Mendham High School would be stripped away from the district to become a standalone regional high school for the Chesters and Mendhams. In the second scenario, the existing PreK-8 districts would be dissolved and combined with West Morris Mendham to create a consolidated PreK-12 district. In either scenario, Washington Township would take over West Morris Central High School and become its own PreK-12 district. Significant tax savings would have been achieved for the Chesters and Mendhams under both scenarios, with equivalent tax increases for Washington Township.

Schools
Schools in the district (with 2020–21 enrollment data from the National Center for Education Statistics) are:
Elementary schools
Dickerson Elementary School with 317 students in grades PreK-2
Melissa Fair, Principal
Bragg Elementary School with 325 students in grades 3-5
Michele Stanton, Principal
Middle school
Black River Middle School with 402 students in grades 6-8
Andrew White, Principal

Dickerson and Bragg Schools are located on County Route 510, east of Chester Borough; Black River Middle School is on County Route 513 (North Road), north of Chester Borough.

Administration
Core members of the district's administration are:
Dr. Christina VanWoert, Superintendent
Tanya Dawson, Business Administrator / Board Secretary

Board of education
The district's board of education is comprised of nine members who set policy and oversee the fiscal and educational operation of the district through its administration. As a Type II school district, the board's trustees are elected directly by voters to serve three-year terms of office on a staggered basis, with three seats up for election each year held (since 2012) as part of the November general election. The board appoints a superintendent to oversee the district's day-to-day operations and a business administrator to supervise the business functions of the district. As a consolidated school district, all residents in the two constituent municipalities vote for board members who represent the entire district, not just the municipality in which they reside.

References

External links 
Chester School District

Chester School District, National Center for Education Statistics

Chester Borough, New Jersey
Chester Township, New Jersey
New Jersey District Factor Group J
School districts in Morris County, New Jersey